The 2018 California gubernatorial election was held on November 4, 2018, to elect the Governor of California, concurrently with elections for the rest of California's executive branch, as well as elections to the United States Senate in other states and elections to the United States House of Representatives and various state and local elections. Incumbent Democratic Governor Jerry Brown was ineligible to run for re-election for a third consecutive (and fifth non-consecutive) term due to term limits from the Constitution of California. The race was between the incumbent Democratic Lieutenant Governor Gavin Newsom and businessman John H. Cox, a Republican, who qualified for the general election after placing first and second in the June 5, 2018, primary election. 

Newsom won in a landslide, with 62% of the vote, the biggest victory in a gubernatorial race in California since Earl Warren won re-election in 1950, and the biggest victory for a non-incumbent since 1930. This is the first time Democrats have won three consecutive gubernatorial elections in the state's history, with Newsom getting a record-high number of almost eight million votes. This election marked the first time since 2002 in which California voters elected a governor of the political party opposite of the one in control of the White House. Newsom assumed office on January 7, 2019.

Candidates
A primary election was held on June 5, 2018. Under California's non-partisan blanket primary law, all candidates appeared on the same ballot, regardless of party. Voters may vote for any candidate, regardless of their party affiliation. The top two finishers – regardless of party – advance to the general election in November, regardless of whether a candidate manages to receive a majority of the votes cast in the primary election.

Democratic Party

Declared
 Akinyemi Agbede, mathematician
 Juan M. Bribiesca, retired physician
 Thomas Jefferson Cares, blockchain start-up CEO
 John Chiang, California State Treasurer
 Delaine Eastin, former California State Superintendent of Public Instruction
 Robert Davidson Griffis, 2016 Libertarian candidate for president
 Albert Caesar Mezzetti, former Manteca City Councilman
 Gavin Newsom, Lieutenant Governor of California
 Amanda Renteria, national political director for Hillary Clinton's 2016 presidential campaign and candidate for CA-21 in 2014
 Michael Shellenberger, founder of the Breakthrough Institute
 Klement Tinaj, actor, martial artist, stuntman, and producer
 Antonio Villaraigosa, former mayor of Los Angeles

Declined
 Xavier Becerra, Attorney General of California (ran for re-election)
 Scooter Braun, music manager
 George Clooney, actor and activist
 Kevin de León, President pro tempore of the California State Senate (ran for the U.S. Senate)
 Eric Garcetti, Mayor of Los Angeles
 Bob Iger, CEO of The Walt Disney Company
 Sheryl Sandberg, Facebook COO
 Libby Schaaf, Mayor of Oakland (ran for re-election)
 Jackie Speier, U.S. Representative (ran for re-election)
 Tom Steyer, hedge fund manager, philanthropist, and environmentalist

Republican Party

Declared
 Travis Allen, State Assemblyman
 John H. Cox, businessman
 Yvonne Girard, US Military Veteran
 Peter Y. Liu, entrepreneur, real estate agent, US Army veteran
 Robert C. Newman II, businessman, psychologist, farmer
 K. Pearce (write-in)

Withdrawn
 Rosey Grier, minister and retired NFL player
 David Hadley, former state assemblyman
 Allen Ishida, former Tulare County Supervisor
 Doug Ose, former U.S. Representative

Declined
 Tim Donnelly, former state assemblyman, candidate for governor in 2014, and candidate for CA-08 in 2016 (running for CA-08)
 Kevin Faulconer, Mayor of San Diego
 Ashley Swearengin, former mayor of Fresno
 Peter Thiel, venture capitalist

Libertarian Party

Declared
 Zoltan Istvan, Transhumanist Party nominee for President of the United States in 2016
 Nickolas Wildstar, political activist, rapper, and write-in candidate for governor in 2014

Green Party

Declared
 Christopher Carlson, puppeteer
 Veronika Fimbres (write-in)
 Josh Jones, author, geologist, solar electric designer

Peace and Freedom Party

Declared
 Gloria La Riva, activist and nominee for President of the United States in 2016

Independent (No Party)

Declared
 Armando M. Arreola (write-in)
 Shubham Goel (Later a contestant on Netflix's The Circle)
 Hakan "Hawk" Mikado
 Desmond Silveira, engineer and former national committee member of the American Solidarity Party
 Arman Soltani (write-in)
 Jeffrey Edward Taylor
 Peter Crawford Valentino (write-in)
 Johnny Wattenburg

Notes

Primary election
From the later half of 2017, Lieutenant governor Gavin Newsom was widely seen as the favored front runner for the top two primary. Businessman John Cox and Los Angeles Mayor Antonio Villaraigosa had both been running closely behind Newsom to obtain the second place spot. However soon in late 2017, as more prominent Democrats entered the race, Villaraigosa saw his polling numbers slip out of competition with Cox by the start of 2018. This had mainly left the race between Newsom and Cox, with a third place free for all between Allen and Villaraigosa.

Endorsements

Polling

Graphical summary

with Kevin Faulconer and Eric Garcetti

Results

Results by county 
Red represents counties won by Cox. Blue represents counties won by Newsom. Green represents counties won by Villaraigosa.

General election

Predictions

Endorsements

Polling

with Newsom and Chiang

with Newsom and Villaraigosa

with Villaraigosa and Garcetti

Results
Newsom won the general election by the largest margin of any California gubernatorial candidate since Earl Warren's re-election in 1950. In addition to winning the traditional Democratic strongholds of the San Francisco Bay Area, Los Angeles County, Sacramento, and North Coast, Newsom performed well in the traditionally swing Central Coast, San Bernardino County, and San Diego County, as well as narrowly winning traditionally Republican Orange County – the latter voting for a Democrat for the first time in a gubernatorial election since Jerry Brown's first re-election in 1978. Cox did well in the state's more rural areas, even flipping Stanislaus County; Stanislaus is the only county that voted for Brown in 2014 but flipped to Cox in 2018. Cox also narrowly won Fresno County and Riverside County in the Inland Empire in addition to handily winning traditionally Republican Kern County in the Central Valley.

Results by county 

Here are the results of the election by county. Blue represents counties won by Newsom. Red represents counties won by Cox.

Counties that flipped from Republican to Democratic
 Orange (largest municipality: Anaheim)
 San Bernardino (largest municipality: San Bernardino)

Counties that flipped from Democratic to Republican
 Stanislaus (largest municipality: Modesto)

Voter demographics

See also
 2018 California lieutenant gubernatorial election
 2018 California State Treasurer election
 2021 California gubernatorial recall election

References

External links
Candidates at Vote Smart
Candidates at Ballotpedia

Official campaign websites
 John H. Cox (R) for Governor
 Gavin Newsom (D) for Governor

Gubernatorial
2018
California
Gavin Newsom